Dialectica hedemanni is a moth of the family Gracillariidae. It is known from the Canary Islands and Madeira.

The larvae feed on Lavatera acerifolia, Lavatera arborea, Lavatera phoenicea, Malva neglecta, Malva parviflora and Malva sylvestris. They mine the leaves of their host plant. The mine starts as a broad epidermal corridor. In the end, it becomes a full depth transparent blotch. Some silk is deposited inside the mine and the blotch is hardly puckered. Pupation takes place outside of the mine.

References

Dialectica (moth)
Moths described in 1896